Golas may refer to:

People 

 Arkadiusz Gołaś (1981 – 2005), Polish volleyball player
 Andrzej Maria Gołaś (born 1946), Polish politician
 Michał Gołaś (born 1984), Polish professional road bicycle racer 
 Thaddeus Golas (1924 – 1997), American author 
 Victor Golas (born 1990), Brazilian footballer
 Wiesław Gołas (born 1930), Polish actor

Geography 
 Golaš, a mountain of Serbia
 Gołas, a village in east-central Poland

See also
 Gołaś (disambiguation)